Bonnor may refer to:

George Bonnor (1855–1912), Australian cricketer
William B. Bonnor (1920–2015), mathematician and gravitation physicist
 Bonnor beam

See also 

James Bonnor Middleton (1865–1913), South African cricketer